Mercury is the first full-length and currently the only studio album by the British indie rock band Longview.

Track listing

Personnel
Credits adapted from liner notes.

Longview
 Rob McVey - guitar, vocals
 Doug Morch - guitar, backing vocals
 Aidan Banks - bass, backing vocals
 Matt Dabbs - drums
Additional musicians and production

 Rick Parashar - producer, engineer
 Brian Rose - original producer (1)
 Sharon Hart - backing vocals (1)
 Sarah Shawcross - vocal arrangement (1 4, 5, 8), backing vocals (1, 5, 8)
 Paul Buckmaster - string arrangement (1, 6, 9 to 12), string conducting (1, 6, 9 to 12)
 Simon James - concertmaster (1, 6, 9 to 12)
 Dave Burnham - original engineering (1)
 Christian Mock - additional engineering
 Geoff Ott - additional engineering
 Honchol Sin - recording assistance
 Reed Ruddy - string engineering
 Sam Hofstedt - string engineering assistance
 Chris Lord-Alge - mixing
 Jack Joseph Puig - mixing
 David Thoener - mixing
 Ted Jensen - mastering
 Free Barrabas! - design
 Mary Scanlon - photography

2003 debut albums
Columbia Records albums
Albums produced by Rick Parashar